Roberto Carlos em ritmo de aventura is a 1968 Brazilian musical comedy film directed by Roberto Farias, with screenplay written by Paulo Mendes Campos. The film is the first of a trilogy directed by Farias featuring the singer Roberto Carlos.

Synopsis 
Singer Roberto Carlos is making a film when he is chased by an international gang who want to kidnap him to the United States and force him to write songs.

Soundtrack 
The film soundtrack was released in 1967, a year before the movie. The record was ranked No. 24 in the list of Rolling Stone Brasil 100 Greatest Brazilian Music Records.

Track listing

A side 
 "Eu Sou Terrível" (Roberto Carlos – Erasmo Carlos)
 "Como É Grande o Meu Amor por Você" (Roberto Carlos)
 "Por Isso Corro Demais" (Roberto Carlos)
 "Você Deixou Alguém A Esperar" (Édson Ribeiro)
 "De Que Vale Tudo Isso" (Roberto Carlos)
 "Folhas De Outono" (Francisco Lara – Jovenil Santos)

B- side 
 "Quando" (Roberto Carlos)
 "É Tempo De Amar" (Pedro Camargo – José Ari)
 "Você Não Serve Pra Mim" (Renato Barros)
 "E Por Isso Estou Aqui" (Roberto Carlos)
 "O Sósia" (Getúlio Côrtes)
 "Só Vou Gostar De Quem Gosta De Mim" (Rossini Pinto)

Lineup 
 Roberto Carlos: voice and harmonica
 Renato Barros (Renato e seus Blue Caps): lead and solo guitar
 Paulo César Barros (Renato e seus Blue Caps): bass
 Lafayette: keyboard
 Tony (Renato e seus Blue Caps): drums

Cast 
 Roberto Carlos	
 José Lewgoy	
 Reginaldo Farias	
 Rose Passini
 David Cardoso	
 Jorge de Oliveira	
 Márcia Gonçalves	
 Jacques Jover	
 Ana Levy	
 Marisa Levy	
 Sérgio Malta	
 Federico Mendes	
 Jannik C. Pagh	
 Elizabeth Pereira	
 Grace L. Silva	
 Leopoldo Volks		
 Guiomar Yukawa

References

External links 

1968 musical comedy films
Films directed by Roberto Farias
1960s Portuguese-language films
1968 films
Brazilian musical comedy films